Philip Stewart Solomon (January 3, 1954 – April 20, 2019) was an American experimental filmmaker noted for his work with both film and video. In recent years, Solomon had earned acclaim for a series of films that incorporate machinima made using games from the Grand Theft Auto series. His films are often described as haunting and lyrical.

Solomon was an associate of the influential American experimental filmmaker Stan Brakhage, with whom he taught film at the University of Colorado in Boulder. Solomon and Brakhage collaborated on three films. In a 1992 poll for the British film magazine Sight & Sound, Brakhage picked Solomon's Remains to Be Seen as one of the ten greatest films of all time. The film had previously been selected as one of the top ten films of 1989 by the Village Voice.

Solomon was awarded a Guggenheim Fellowship in 1994. In 2007, he was the recipient of the Thatcher Hoffman Smith Award from the University of Oklahoma. In 2012 Solomon received the Knight Fellowship of the USA (United States Artists) Fellows program, alongside novelist Annie Proulx, sculptor Alison Saar, jazz musician Jack DeJohnette, dancer and choreographer Trisha Brown, and artist Theaster Gates.

On April 10, 2010, Solomon's American Falls opened at the Corcoran Gallery of Art in Washington, D.C. The six-projection video/sound installation received great acclaim before closing in July 2010.  In conjunction with the Corcoran exhibition, Solomon's career as a filmmaker was explored in "Rhapsodies in Silver,"  a three-program survey at Washington's National Gallery of Art.

A re-edited, feature-length, single-projection version of American Falls was featured at the New York Film Festival's "Views from the Avant Garde" on October 1, 2010. The single projection version of the film condenses the original multi-projector format into a triptych, placing three independent (yet associative) images next to one another. In Fall 2012, Solomon screened a three-channel version of American Falls at the Museum of the Moving Image in Astoria, New York, as part of the exhibition "Film After Film."

In the May/June 2010  Film Comment poll, The Top 50 Avant-Garde Filmmakers of the Decade, Phil Solomon placed at number 5, tied with his late colleague, Stan Brakhage.

Biography
Originally from New York City, Solomon attended Binghamton University and received an Masters of Fine Arts from the Massachusetts College of Art. One of Solomon's instructors was the experimental filmmaker Ken Jacobs, who started his first class with a screening of Tony Conrad's film The Flicker. Solomon initially disliked the film, but the experience, followed by a screening of his future collaborator Stan Brakhage's Blue Moses, had a profound impact on his development as a filmmaker. Another formative experience came in the form of a lecture by critic Fred Camper on Brakhage's Anticipation of the Night.

Solomon began making films in 1975. Solomon has since destroyed some of his early works, many of which were made in imitation of Brakhage.

Solomon had been teaching at the University of Colorado since 1991.

Solomon died on April 20, 2019 from complications following surgery at the age of 65.

Preservation
Solomon's films have been housed at the Academy Film Archive since 2005, and they have preserved several of his films, including "As If We," "Twilight Psalm I: The Lateness of the Hour," and "What's Out Tonight Is Lost."

Filmography

The Passage of the Bride (1979–1980)
Nocturne (1980)
What's Out Tonight Is Lost (1983)
The Secret Garden (1988)
Clepsydra (1992)
The Exquisite Hour (1989/1994)
Remains to Be Seen (1989/1994)
 Elementary Phrases (w/ Stan Brakhage) (1994)
The Snowman (1995)
 Concrescence (w/ Stan Brakhage) (1996)
 Psalm I: "The Lateness of the Hour " (1999 – )
 Psalm II: "Walking Distance " (1999)
 Psalm III: "Night of the Meek " (2002)
 Seasons... (w/ Stan Brakhage) (2002)
Crossroad (w/ Mark LaPore) (2005)
Rehearsals for Retirement (2007)
Last Days In a Lonely Place (2007)
 Still Raining, Still Dreaming (2008)
 American Falls (2000 –2012 )
 The Emblazoned Apparitions (2013)
 Psalm IV: "Valley of the Shadow" (2013)

References

External links
 Phil Solomon Official Website
 Professor Phil Solomon Faculty Page, Film Studies, University of Colorado at Boulder
 "Reflection on the Avant-Garde Experience: A Meditation on Phil Solomon's The Secret Garden by Dana Anderson
 Phil Solomon program at the Conversations At The Edge program Conversations At The Edge at The School of the Art Institute of Chicago
 
 Michael Sicinski's Cinemascope magazine article on Phil Solomon
 Michael Sicinski's review of "Last Days In A Lonely Place" by Phil Solomon
 Patrick Friel's review of Phil Solomons In Memoriam trilogy as printed in The 11th Views from the Avant-Garde, the experimental film program of The New York Film Festival
 NY Times review by Manohla Dargis
 CINEMAD interview with Phil Solomon
 American Falls installation and NGA Retrospective review by Genevieve Yue
 ARTFORUM review of American Falls at the NYFF
 Film Comment Avant-Garde Film poll, Top 50 Filmmakers of the Decade, May/June 2010
 303 Magazine: "Phil Solomon: USA Knight Fellow
 Westword: "Boulder-based filmmaker Phil Solomon awarded USA grant after finishing American Falls"
 The Brooklyn Rail: "Chemical Sundowns: Phil Solomon with Leo Goldsmith
 Boulder Weekly: "Songs of Solomon: CU Filmmaker works in the medium of visual music"
 Huffington Post, UK: "London Film Festival Review: Phil Solomon's American Falls."

1954 births
2019 deaths
Film directors from New York City
Binghamton University alumni
Massachusetts College of Art and Design alumni
University of Colorado faculty
Jewish American artists
American experimental filmmakers
21st-century American Jews